Guty  (historical variants Guttek, Gutteck) is a village in the administrative district of Gmina Wieliczki, within Olecko County, Warmian-Masurian Voivodeship, in northern Poland.

The village has a population of 50.

References

Guty